Xu Xiaoliang (born 30 January 1962) is a Chinese former basketball player who competed in the 1988 Summer Olympics.

References

1962 births
Living people
Chinese men's basketball players
1982 FIBA World Championship players
Olympic basketball players of China
Basketball players at the 1988 Summer Olympics
Asian Games medalists in basketball
Basketball players at the 1986 Asian Games
Asian Games gold medalists for China
Medalists at the 1986 Asian Games